Daletvirus is a genus of viruses in the realm Ribozyviria, containing the single species Daletvirus boae.

Host 
The boa constrictor (Boa constrictor) and the Savu python (Liasis mackloti savuensis) serve as its hosts.

References 

Virus genera